Klemens Großimlinghaus (6 November 1941 – 27 June 1991) was a German racing cyclist. He rode in the 1968 Tour de France.

References

External links
 

1941 births
1991 deaths
German male cyclists
Place of birth missing
Sportspeople from Krefeld
Cyclists from North Rhine-Westphalia